The 2002 California Golden Bears softball team represented the University of California, Berkeley in the 2002 NCAA Division I softball season.  The Golden Bears were coached by Diane Ninemire, who led her fifteenth season.  The Golden Bears finished with a record of 56–19.  They played their home games at Levine-Fricke Field and competed in the Pacific-10 Conference, where they finished fourth with a 12–9 record.

The Golden Bears were invited to the 2002 NCAA Division I softball tournament, where they swept the West Regional and then completed a run through the Women's College World Series to claim their first NCAA Women's College World Series Championship.

Roster

Schedule

References

California
California Golden Bears softball seasons
California Softball
Women's College World Series seasons
NCAA Division I softball tournament seasons